Thomas Shaw was an English violinist, violist, clarinettist and composer who was born c.1752, probably in Bath, and who probably died in Paris on 28 June 1827 or c.1830. Thomas Shaw was the son of Bathonian musician Thomas Shaw and the younger brother of violinist Anthony Shaw. The majority of his career was spent at the Drury Lane theatre in London as an instrumentalist, violin soloist, band leader, musical director and in-house composer.

Thomas Shaw's long association with the Drury Lane earned him to be mentioned in The Pin-basket, to the Children of Thespis. A satire, a satirical poem about Londonian theatre life by the famous critic John Williams whose alter ego, Anthony Pasquin, ironically wonders "who can go see" or "endure" the Drury Lane's plays, actors, and singers [...]
  [...]and SHAW* on catgut ſcrape his ſharps and flats,
 To moral mice and sentimental rats.[...]
 *a Violent Democrat, leader of the Drury-Lane band, and one of the Dictators of that Republic.
According to the Biographical Dictionary of Actors, Actresses, Musicians, Dancers, Managers & Other Stage Personnel in London, 1660–1800, "a caricature portrait of Thomas Shaw, captioned 'Shaw-Shaw' and showing the musician playing the violin was drawn and engraved by Robert Dighton and published by the artist in 1786".

Beginnings in Bath 

There is little information about Thomas Shaw's early life and his career prior to going to London has remained rather obscure.

He was the son of a musician born in 1715, also called Thomas Shaw, who was a double-bass player active in Bath and London for many years as a leading string player and concert director, including in music festivals in Westminster and at Covent Garden. Thomas Shaw senior must have been a well established musician as he became a member of the Royal Society of Musicians in 1754 and was a "superannuated musician" according to the European Magazine and London Review when he died in Bath in 1792.

Thomas Shaw junior must have been born about 1752 as he was declared to be 28 years old when he was recommended for membership of the Royal Society of Musicians in September 1780. By this time Thomas was already a regular player in London, both in the band at the Drury Lane theatre, whom he had already joined by 1778, and at the Haymarket, in the summers. (Note that musicologist Roger Fiske seems to be incorrect when he states that Thomas became a member the Royal Society of Musicians in 1776; indeed December 1776 is when Thomas's brother Anthony, also a violinist, was admitted to membership.)

However Thomas's career had started over a decade earlier.

Shaw was already an accomplished player when he gave his earliest known performance in Bath in April 1769. Indeed, the advertisement in the Bath Chronicle and Weekly Gazette on Thursday 13 April 1769 deemed him known enough that, aside from distinguishing him from his father, no further precisions about Thomas is given:
 By PARTICULAR DESIRE.
 On WEDNESDAY the 19th Inſtant, at Mr Gyde's Room, will be
 A Concert of Vocal and Inſstrumental Muſic, for Mr ORPIN. The Vocal Part by Miſs Harper. A Leſſon, and a Concerto on the Harpſichord by a Scholar of Mr. ORPIN's, a Child of ſeven Years of Age. The firſt Violin by Mr. Shaw, Jun. The Particulars of the Performance are expreſſed in the Bills.
 Tickets to be had of Mr. ORPIN, at Mr. Gueſt's in the Abbey Green, and at the uſual Places, at 5s. each.
 After the CONCERT will be a BALL.
 To Begin preciſely at Half after Six o'Clock.

His last known performances in the area were in April 1774 in Bristol and in November of the same year in Bath. But, according to Peter Holman, he seems to have remained active as a violinist there until 1776–77. He must have had a rather prominent position in Bath's community of musicians as, among other things, he led the orchestra in Thomas Linley's subscription concerts of the autumn 1769 and spring 1770 and was a member of the theatre band in 1771. In addition, his music was being performed and published; an overture composed by him was played in a concert at the end of December 1771 and by 1772 he was playing his own compositions in Bath and Bristol.

Quickly, Thomas Shaw was recognised as a very talented instrumentalist, who played the violin "in a very masterly Manner and with much Taste". This inevitably lead to a tense competition, if not rivalry, with Thomas Linley junior. Happy to play the one against the other, the press would compare the two violinists. Whilst Shaw was considered 'the most perfect Master of the Fingerboard", Linley was deemed to have "a graceful Manner of bowing" and "a 'Polish' of Tone and Manner".

But, above all, the real tension was due to the quasi-monopole the Linley family had over concert life in Bath and Bristol and Thomas Shaw joined the ranks and became a leading member of the breakaway group of musicians headed by William Herschel who in 1772 began to challenge the Linleys' hold. During the spring of 1772 Herschel and Shaw gave a certain number of concerts together, Shaw on the violin and Herschel on the fortepiano.

On Thursday 4 June 1772 and on Thursday 11 June 1772 the Bath Chronicle and Weekly Gazette advertises as follows:

 BRISTOL.
 AT the Aſſembly-Room in Princeſs-Street, on Thurſday Evening the 11th of June, under the Conduct of Mr. HERSCHEL and Mr. SHAW, jun. will be a
 CONCERTO SPIRITUALE
 Or, SACRED PERFORMANCE.
 Conſiſting of the famous MISERERE of Signior Gregorio Allegri, ſung at the Pope's Chapel in Rome on good Friday, with the ſolemn POPULE MEUS of Petrus Aloyſius Preneſtinus (performed but once in England). Also Part of the celebrated STABAT MATER of Signior Auriſchio [sic.] and Pergoleſi. with Choruſes from the Psalms of Sig. Benedetto Marcello, with Inſtrumental Accompaniments, by Mr. Herſchell [sic.].
 The principal Vocal Parts by the two Signora's Farinelli [sic.]; a Concerto on the Hautboy by Mr. Herſchel; the firſt Violin, and a Solo by Mr. Shaw, jun. The Chorus from Bath, Wells, Bristol, &c – To begin at Half paſt Six o'Clock.
 Tickets, at 5s. each, to be had at the American, Exchange, and Aſſembly Coffee-Houſes; where alſo may be had, Books of the Performance, with an English Tranſlation of the Latin Part, at 6d. each.

On Thursday 17 December 1772 the Bath Chronicle and Weekly Gazette publishes an advertisement for another concert by the Herschel/Shaw duo in Bath, this time for the benefit of the 20 year old Thomas himself:
 AT the Old Aſſembly Rooms, on TUESDAY, Dec. 22, will be a CONCERT of Vocal and Inſtrumental Muſic, for Mr. SHAW, Jun.
 The Vocal Part by Signora FARINELLI, and Maſter PECK. The Firſt Violin by Mr. SHAW, Jun. The Hautboy by Mr. FISCHER. And the Harpſichord by Mr. HERSCHEL.
 To begin at a Quarter paſt Six o'Clock. - Particulars of the Concert will be inſerted in the Bills.
 Tickets to be had of Mr. SHAW, Jun. in Duke-Street, at Mr. Gyde's Rooms, the Bookſellers and Coffee-Houſes, at Five Shillings each.

However the tensions and difficulties with the Linleys may eventually have played a part in Thomas's determination to seek a more promising future in London in 1776–77.  He was then still in his early 20s.

Career at the Drury Lane 

By 1778, Thomas Shaw had joined the band at the Drury Lane theatre in London. He started leading the band at the same theatre in March 1786, at the occasion of the premiere of Redemption (a pasticcio oratorio made out of works by Handel and Samuel Arnold), and he seems to have retained that post for about 23 years, until 1809.

His violin playing was put on show regularly there, playing, for instance, the obligato parts accompanying the singers in pieces like Handel's L'Allegro, il Penseroso ed il Moderato or executing fully fledged violin concertos in between parts of entertainments or oratorios like Messiah.

As early as 1786, Shaw's role, beyond leading the band and playing solos, involved overall musical direction; indeed, in his Reminiscences, Michael Kelly recounts how during a rehearsal for the English adaptation of Grétry's Richard Coeur-de-lion, in which the celebrated tragedian John Philip Kemble sang the main character, Thomas Shaw "called out from the orchestra", reproaching "dear Mr Kemble" for "murdering the time", to which the latter, "calmly, and coolly taking a pinch of snuff," replied that "it [was] better for [him] to murder time at once than be continually beating him as [Shaw] did". Roger Fiske remarks though that Charles Dibdin "thought him a much better leader than Covent Garden's Baumgarten".

In addition to the above roles of soloist, band leader and musical director, Thomas Shaw composed music for the Drury Lane theatre's productions. The first such work appears to have been the afterpiece opera The Island of Saint Marguerite, whose music was partly composed and partly compiled by Shaw.

Other music composed by Shaw for Drury Lane includes instrumental works such as chamber music, piano sonatas, a violin concerto as well as various pieces of operatic music (overtures, airs, songs, choruses, marches, vocal duets and trios). His operatic music was either composed as incidental music to new productions, used in lieu of older numbers in reprisal of works by other composers, or inserted in pasticcios.

He wrote an overture and other instrumental interludes for the revival of Michael Arne's Cymon in 1791. According to advertisements both the overture to The Island of Saint Marguerite and the instrumental pieces for Cymon were published in parts, but they seem to have mostly survived in keyboard arrangements, except for a Spirituoso interlude and the Marches in the Procession for which a full score still exists. Thereafter Shaw composed only the occasional song for Drury Lane, even though he later became one of the theatre's proprietors.

The Island of Saint Marguerite 

The various events that constitute the French Revolution, from the fall of the Bastille to the imprisonment and subsequent execution of the royal couple, as well as the contemporary Anglo-French wars, were a source of both dread and fascination in Britain, and, as such, inspired musical responses by British composers. Thomas Shaw's and John St John's The Island of Saint Marguerite may have been one of the first such works as it premiered on 13 November 1789, barely four months after the storming of the Bastille which is the event that inspired it.

According to musicologist Mary Térey-Smith, Shaw's opera was meant to be called "The Iron Mask" in reference to the Bastille prison (the famous mysterious prisoner died there in 1703),  but " the Lord Chamberlain's Office objected to the political content."  However, as explained in the review of the show's premiere by the European Magazine and London Review of December 1789, much more than the originally intended title was changed and indeed all references to the recent events in France were censored and removed from the piece:

 This perſormance, we are told, was originally deſigned for a repreſentation oſ the aſſault and deſtruction oſ the Baſtile, with which was blended the ſtory of the Iron Maſk; but when it came beſore the Licencer, every part oſ the piece that bore immediate reſemblance to the late popular events in Paris, was from political conſiderations forbidden, and therefore is unavoidably brought forward a maimed and mutilated ſtate.

In response to the censorship the authors seem to have resorted to selecting a less obvious, if not less known, reference to French prisons and to the Prisoner in the Iron Mask and fixed their choice on Sainte-Marguerite whose Fort Royal was one of the State prisons where the very man was held prisoner from 1687 to 1698 before being transferred to the Bastille. Not much, if anything at all, remained of the original idea as is shown by the synopsis written by the European Magazine and London Review. And the review concludes by stating:

 All therefore that can be ſaid of the preſent performance is, that the ſcenery is beautitul, the actors did juſtice to their parts, and the muſic is well ſelected.

Part of the music (including the overture, some arias, duets and choruses) was composed by Shaw himself. However, in his dedication inside the published vocal score of 1789, Shaw advises that the librettist St John actually selected some other pieces of music, which probably include the opening chorus "Welcome all who sigh with Truth" whose music is borrowed from Geminiani and the Act I finale ("My love, from hour to hour", duet between the Commandant and Carline) borrowed from Mozart's Le nozze di Figaro (Act III opening duet "Crudel! perché finora" between the Count and Susanna). The latter, according to Robert Fiske, had just been published in London.

Synopsis published in the European Magazine and London Review:

 The ſtory of this Opera is as follows:
 Carline, a beautiful young lady, having experienced misfortunes, determines in diſguſt to enter a Convent; but being ſoon tired of that life reſolves on an eſcape, which ſhe has hopes to accompliſh by means of the Commandant, who had bribed his way into the Convent on amorous purpoſes. The priſon, over which the Commandant preſides, contains a young man, who, to prevent diſcovery, is concealed by an iron malk. This young man, in hopes of effecting his delivery, writes his name on a ſilver plate, and throws it into the moat that ſurrounds his priſon. Jonas, a fiſherman, finds the plate, and being ſeen by the Turnkey is immediately ſecured, and doomed to the torture. The Commandant however, hearing that nobody had ſeen the plate but the fiſherman, and that he could not read, orders his releaſe, particularly on finding that he ſells fiſh to the Nuns, and consequently can aſſiſt him in his views upon Carline. The fiſherman, who is in love with Nannette, a ſervant in the Convent, procures a ladder, intending to accompany the Commandant into the houſe ; but while he is singing, the Commandant enters, and takes the ladder in with him. It had been determined between the Commandant and Carline, that ſhe ſhould aſſume the male attire, under which ſhe eſcapes. After her delivery, hearing the Commandant mention his priſoner, her curioſity is excited, and ſhe prevails on the Commandant to let her ſee the unhappy captive. An interview takes place between Carline and the Priſoner, who proves her own brother. The Commandant, on finding his priſoner was diſcovered, orders him and Carline to cloſe confinement; but at this time the people of the town, underſtanding that the priſoner was of Royal birth, determined to ſet him free, which, after a conteſt with the Commandant and his ſoldiers, they effect, and the piece concludes.

Original cast of November 1789

The piece must have had some success as it was at the Drury Lane during 3 seasons and had a total of 38 performances (12 in 1789, 20 in 1790, 4 in 1791, and finally 2 in 1793).

Financial difficulties 
The Drury Lane books show that, as of January 1802, Thomas was to be paid £8 a week (about £350 in today's money) in addition to which he would receive money for his compositions.
Three years later his wages had increased to £10 weekly (about £440 in today's money).

Shockingly in September 1807 his salary had been almost halved to £6 a week. In truth, it did not make a great deal of difference because Sheridan, who was manager of the Drury Lane, never paid Shaw in full whatever he was due.
And, even though Thomas Shaw had acquired a small share of Drury Lane at the beginning of the 1795–96 season, he ended being in serious financial difficulties at the beginning 1798 solely because Sheridan kept failing to pay him.

Though Sheridan had promised to "settle Shaw's business" in a letter to Richard Peake, he obviously did not keep his word as, at some point, Shaw was arrested for his debts. Ten years later, in July 1808,  Shaw was still owed £7983.00 by Sheridan, equivalent to the mind-blowing amount of over £360,000.00 in today's money!

When the Drury Lane theatre burned down in 1809, Sheridan, who had still not settled his debt with Thomas Shaw, was financially ruined. To deal with the theatre's complex debts (Shaw was in fact one of the many claimants against the management of the Drury Lane Theatre), Sheridan turned to politician Samuel Whitbread. Whitbread would head the company's management, deal with the theatre's debts and oversee the rebuilding.

In May 1810, Sheridan, maybe seeking investors or trying to lure Shaw back, offered him a £3000 share in the proprietorship of Drury Lane, in addition to the renter's share of £500 Shaw already own, advising him that he "could do well" with it.

A year later, in May 1811, Sheridan was still promising Shaw to pay half of his debt to him "in a fortnight", even though Sheridan was now without resources as Shaw later found out through Samuel Whitbread who had obtained Sheridan's resignation from the Drury Lane management. As the new head of Drury Lane's management, Whitbread offered Shaw to pay him £1000 outright for his £3000 share, £12 10s per annum for his £500 share as well as 5s on the pound for the arrears in salary. This settlement offer was refused by Shaw in his letter dated 15 July 1811.

Four years later, in 1815, Shaw and Sheridan were still in bitter conflict; Shaw was a "hostile witness against Sheridan and Sheridan's income from the fruit office at Drury Lane". This affair is the last trace there is of Thomas Shaw in London.

Later life and career 
In 1811, George Colman, who had taken over the management of the Little Theatre in the Hay from his father and bought the theatre, offered Shaw the post "President of the Orchestra", adding that his responsibilities in this role would need clarification since there had been misunderstandings in the past. There is no evidence that Thomas Shaw accepted the offer.

In the Autumn of 1811, Shaw applied for the post of leader of the band at the Lyceum Theatre in Wellington Street off the Strand but was unsuccessful. Writing to Samuel Whitbread in October 1811, he expresses how he feels that "[...] Calumnies [...are being] spread abroad against [his] Name and Character [...]". Without naming them openly in his letter, Shaw directly accuses Thomas Sheridan (son of the Sheridan manager of Drury Lane referred to earlier in this article) and Samuel James Arnold who were both involved in the Lyceum's management at the time.

It is unclear why Thomas Shaw eventually left England between 1815 and 1817, though, amongst other things, he might have gone to flee his debtors.

In 1817 Thomas Shaw is in Paris where he composes and publishes the Anthem "Heavenly choir, assist our strain" played at the funeral service given on 16 November 1817 at the Eglise de l'Oratoire Saint-Honoré ou du Louvre, upon request of the British citizens living in Paris, for the memory for Princess Charlotte of Wales who had died 10 days earlier giving birth to a still born son. The title of the piece in its published version of 1817 leaves no doubt about the identity of its composer ("composed by Thomas Shaw, late Leader of the Band at the Theatre Royal Drury Lane and Vauxhall.") or the place where it was performed (in the Church of the Oratoire, Rue St-Honoré à Paris).

A few years later, a young Fanny Kemp, who had been sent to school in Paris, found him teaching music there in the 1820s. Her witness account is the last record there is of Thomas Shaw.

Death 

Based on his last location and his age, most agree with the high probability that Thomas Shaw died in Paris around 1830.

Unfortunately the civil records of Paris were destroyed during the Commune in May 1871. Two thirds of the civil records dating prior to 1860 are completely lost. The remaining third is made of painstakingly reconstructed documents, but most of those are lacking information paramount in successfully identifying the individuals mentioned in them.

Yet, there exists one very tantalising death registration among the reconstructed civil records of the Paris archives:

The act is backdated to 29 June 1827 and states that on the previous day (28 June 1827) at 5 pm, at number 21 avenue de Lowendal, died a 74 year old individual named Thomas Shaw. His activity, indicated as "rentier".

The date of birth of Thomas Shaw (our musician and composer) is unknown but is estimated to be around 1752, which would have made him about 74 or 75 years old in June 1827, depending on the month of his birth. This makes him a very plausible candidate for being the Thomas Shaw in the Paris Archives death certificate mentioned above.

The only additional information the death certificate gives us about the individual is that he was a "rentier". However, "rentier" was a rather unprecise term that encompassed about everyone who lived off money that did not come from wages per se but who may have owned some property or received some sort of annuity (from very modest pensioners to big freeholders). Because we know next to nothing about Thomas Shaw's life and state of affairs after he left England (he could well have kept shares in Drury Lane, Margate, etc., and received money for them), the additional information of "rentier" neither validates nor invalidates the hypothesis that the Paris death certificate might be  our Thomas Shaw's.

Frustratingly, because of the state of the Paris civil records dating prior to 1860, there does not seem to be other surviving documents to enlighten us further about the Thomas Shaw mentioned in the death certificate.

Our Thomas Shaw (the musician and composer) and the Thomas Shaw who died in Paris in 1827 may well have been one and the same, the little we know about the both of them makes it tantalisingly plausible, but unfortunately we will never be able to ascertain it.

Private Life

1786 Death 
In their edition of July – Dec. 1786, The European Magazine and London Review erroneously list in their obituaries "Mr. Thomas Shaw, muſician at Drury-Lane Theatre" as deceased on 16 October 1786. A namesake may have passed away on that day and may have been identified as or assume to be our musician by mistake.

Haydn 
In his second London notebook, Haydn recounts his visit for lunch at Thomas Shaw's on 17 September 1791. It seems Shaw would have been quite a fan of Haydn, welcoming him directly at the door wearing a coat with the name Haydn "worked into the very ends of both his collars in the finest steel beads". Haydn adds that Shaw's wife and his two daughters wore headpieces with his name embroidered in gold. He remembers how, to have a souvenir from him, Shaw asked for his tobacco box in exchange of his, and how a few days later the said box had been put in a silver case engraved with "Ex dono Celeberrimi Josephi Haydn" ("gift from the most famous Joseph Haydn"). Finally Haydn writes that, as a souvenir, he received a stick-pin from Mrs Shaw who he deemed to be "the most beautiful woman [he] ever saw".

Margate 
Upon the death of his brother Anthony in August 1792, Thomas Shaw received an eighth interest in the Margate theatre. According to Cecil Price, his association with it continued until 1813.

Works

Instrumental music

Chamber music

Music for keyboard

Stage works

Songs

Sacred music

Discography 

 The overture to The Island of St. Marguerite is available on:

Great Britain Triumphant! Stefanie True, Caroline Schiller, Zoltán Megyesi, Mária Zádori, Reid Spencer. Capella Savaria, Mary Térey-Smith. (Centaur Records, CRC3073, 2011).

 The Violin Concerto in G is available on:

English Classical Violin Concertos, Elizabeth Wallfisch, The Parley of Instruments, Peter Holman (Helios, CDH55260, 2008)

Notes

Sources 

 Fiske, Roger; James, Kenneth E. (2001). "Shaw, Thomas". New Grove Dictionary. Oxford University Press.  and 
 Highfill, Philip H.; Burnim, Kalman A.; Langhans, Edward A. (1973). A Biographical Dictionary of Actors, Actresses, Musicians, Dancers, Managers & Other Stage Personnel in London, 1660–1800. Vol. 13. SIU Press. pp. 294–298.
 English operas : [bound volume of 18th. century selections, Sacred Harmonic Society catalogue number 815.] / Arne ; Arnold ; Bates ; Shaw. London: Longman & Broderip. 1798. pp. 197–200. Royal College of Music Library: D1391/6.
 British Newspaper Archives
 The London Stage Database
 European Magazine and London Review
 Archives de Paris
 
 Woodfield, Ian (1977). The Celebrated Quarrel between Thomas Linley (Senior) and William Herschel: an Episode in the Musical Life of 18th-Century Bath. Bath: University of Bath Music Monographs.
 Whitbread, Samuel. "Samuel Whitbread correspondence concerning the Drury Lane Theatre". Harvard College Library and Houghton Library.
 Price, Cecil J. L. (1966). The Letters of Richard Brinsley Sheridan. Oxford: Clarendon Press.
 Pasquin, Anthony (1796). The pin-basket, to the children of Thespis. A satire. London.
 Shaw, Thomas (1789). The Overture, Songs, Duets, Trios & Choruses in the Comic Opera entitled The Island of St Marguerite, [the words written and the music partly selected by the Hon. J. St. John] ... adapted for the Harpsichord & Voice by Mr. Shaw. London: S. A.&P. Thompson. The British Library: Music Collections DRT Digital Store D.282.(8.).
 New Grove Dictionary of Music and Musicians, 2ª Ed. (2001)

External links 
 

1752 births
1827 deaths
18th-century British male musicians
18th-century English people
British classical musicians
British male violinists
British violinists
Classical-period composers
English classical musicians
English classical violinists
English male classical composers
English opera composers
English violinists
Male classical violinists
Male opera composers
Members of the Royal Society of Musicians
People from Bath, Somerset